17th Visual Effects Society Awards
February 5, 2019

Best Visual Effects in a Visual Effects Driven Motion Picture:
Avengers: Infinity War

Best Visual Effects in a Photoreal Episode:
Lost in Space – Danger, Will Robinson

The 17th Visual Effects Society Awards was an awards ceremony held by the Visual Effects Society, honoring the best visual effects in film and television of 2018. Nominations were announced on January 15, 2019, and the ceremony took place on February 5, 2019, hosted by Patton Oswalt.

Nominees

Honorary Awards
Lifetime Achievement Award:
Chris Meledandri

VES Visionary Award:
Jonathan Nolan

VES Award for Creative Excellence
David Benioff and D. B. Weiss

Film

Television

Other categories

Most nominations

Most wins

References

External links
 Visual Effects Society

2019
2019 film awards
2019 television awards